Augspurger Paper Company Rowhouse 2 is a registered historic building in Woodsdale, Ohio, listed in the National Register on 1984-11-01.

Historic uses 
Single Dwelling

References

External links
Ohio Historic Inventory

National Register of Historic Places in Butler County, Ohio
Houses on the National Register of Historic Places in Ohio
Houses in Butler County, Ohio